Okpara may refer to:

People
Michael Okpara (1920-1984), Nigerian politician
Godwin Okpara (born 1972), Nigerian footballer
Uga Okpara (born 1982), Nigerian footballer
Willy Okpara (born 1968), Nigerian footballer
Judith Okpara Mazagwu, Nigerian actress and performing artist

Places
Okpara, Benin, administrative area of Benin
Okpara Inland, a community in Delta State, Nigeria
Michael Okpara University of Agriculture, Umudike, Abia State, Nigeria